Taking Tiger Mountain by Strategy (Chinese: 智取威虎山; pinyin: zhì qǔ wēi hǔ shān) is a Peking opera play and one of the eight model plays allowed during the Chinese Cultural Revolution.  The plot is based on parts of the popular novel Tracks in the Snowy Forest by Qu Bo, which in turn, is based on the real-life story of an incident in 1946 during the communist campaign to suppress bandits in northeast China in the Chinese Civil War, involving a PLA reconnaissance soldier Yang Zirong who disguised himself as a bandit to infiltrate a local gang of bandits, eventually helping the main communist force destroy the bandits. Unlike other characters depicted in the opera and novel, most of the names of both the protagonists and the bandits are real.

A booklet Taking Tiger Mountain by Strategy was published in English by the Foreign Languages Press, Peking 1971. Described as "revised collectively by the Taking Tiger Mountain by Strategy group of the Peking Opera Troupe of Shanghai (1970 script)", it contains 16 colour photo reproductions, a list of persons in the cast, the script of the ten scenes, and the words and vocal music of nine selected songs. Also are explanatory notes and sketches about the Chinese percussion instruments played in the orchestra.

Cast
Yang Tzu-jung, scout platoon leader of the Chinese People's Liberatrion Army (PLA)

Chief of Staff, PLA regimental chief of staff

Li Yung-chi, railway worker

Chang Pao, hunter's daughter

Shen Teh-hua, PLA scout platoon deputy leader

Medical Orderly, PLA girl medical orderly

Young Kuo, PLA soldier

Chung Chih-cheng, PLA soldier

Lu Hung-yeh, PLA soldier

Lo Chang-chiang, PLA soldier
 
Other soldiers

Hunter Chang, Chang Pao's father

Mother Li, Li Yung-chi's mother

Chang Ta-shan, railway worker

Li Yung-chi's wife

Other villagers

Vulture, bandit chieftain of Tiger Mountain, leader of Kuomintang's "Fifth Peace Preservation Brigade of the Eastern Heilungkiang Region"

Luan Ping, liaison adjutant under Horse Cudgel Hsu, bandit chieftain of Breast Mountain

Bandit Chief of Staff

Bandit Chief Adjutant

Bandit Captain

"Terribles" and other bandits

Scenes
 Advancing in Victory – Winter, 1946
 Chiapi Valley Pillaged – Dusk
 Asking About Bitterness – Afternoon
 Drawing Up a Plan – Early morning
 Up the Mountain – A few days later
 Into the Bandits' Lair – Immediately after the previous scene
 Arousing the Masses – Chiapi Valley
 Sending out Information – Dawn
 Off to the Attack – Morning
 Converging on Hundred Chickens Feast – Lunar New Year's Eve

Adaptations
A film version directed by Xie Tieli was released in 1970. A modern remake, The Taking of Tiger Mountain, directed by Hong Kong film director Tsui Hark was released on December 23, 2014.
Brian Eno, who found a book of postcards from the opera in San Francisco, later used the title on his second solo album, Taking Tiger Mountain (By Strategy).
A Taking Tiger Mountain song was used in a version of The Lion King musical played in Shanghai Disney Resort.

References

External links
Images of the original postcards

Revolutionary operas